Futebol Clube de Alpendorada (abbreviated as FC Alpendorada) is a Portuguese football club based in Alpendorada, Marco de Canaveses in the district of Porto.

Background
FC Alpendorada currently plays in the Campeonato de Portugal which is the fourth tier of Portuguese football. The club was founded in 1960 and they play their home matches at the Estádio Municipal de Alpendorada in Alpendurada e Matos, Marco de Canaveses. The stadium is able to accommodate 15,000 spectators.

The club is affiliated to Associação de Futebol do Porto and has competed in the AF Porto Taça. The club has also entered the national cup competition known as Taça de Portugal on occasions.

Season to season

League and Cup history

Futsal
The club has run a successful futsal team which competed in the Portuguese Futsal First Division and reached the championship play-off stages in 2004–05, 2006–07, 2007–08, 2008–09 and 2009–10. They were relegated from the top flight at the end of the 2010–11 season.

Footnotes

External links
 Official blog and website
 F.C. Alpendorada at ZeroZero, also in 

Football clubs in Portugal
Association football clubs established in 1960
1960 establishments in Portugal